Phillips Army Airfield  is a military airport located at Aberdeen Proving Ground, in Harford County, Maryland, United States.

This U.S. Army airfield has one asphalt paved runway: 4/22 is 7,997 by 200 feet (2,437 x 61 m) in service and two runways, 8/26 is 4,849 by 149 feet (1,478 x 45 m) and 17/35 is 5,004 by 149 feet (1,525 x 45 m), no longer in service.

References

External links 
 

Airports in Maryland
United States Army airfields
Airfields of the United States Army Air Forces in Maryland
Transportation buildings and structures in Harford County, Maryland